Cita en la gloria is a Mexican telenovela produced by Valentín Pimstein for Telesistema Mexicano in 1966.

Cast 
Ángel Garasa
Guillermo Orea
Leonorilda Ochoa
Andrea Palma
Raúl Dantés
Jorge del Campo
Josefina Escobedo
Pepito Fernández

References

External links 

Mexican telenovelas
1966 telenovelas
Televisa telenovelas
Spanish-language telenovelas
1966 Mexican television series debuts
1966 Mexican television series endings